Pandy's test (or Pandy's reaction) is done on the CSF (cerebrospinal fluid) to detect the elevated levels of proteins (mainly globulins). This test is named after the Hungarian neurologist, Pándy Kálmán (1868–1945) who developed this test in the year 1910.

Principle 

Proteins (globulin and albumin) are precipitated by a saturated solution of phenol in water.

The reagent used is phenol (carbolic acid crystals dissolved in water) or, pyrogallic acid or, cresol, usually termed as Pandy's reagent or Pandy's solution.

Procedure 

One drop of CSF sample (collected from the patient by lumbar puncture technique), is added to about 1ml of Pandy's solution. The turbid appearance signifies the presence of elevated levels of globulin protein in the CSF and is regarded as positive Pandy's reaction. The CSF from a normal adult shows no turbidity or precipitates and this is a negative Pandy's reaction.

Reactions and Results 

Proteins in the cerebrospinal fluid, normally albumin and globulin are present in the ratio of 8 to 1. Increases in protein levels are of diagnostic value in neurological diseases.

The normal CSF is clear and transparent fluid. The Pandy's reaction makes it translucent or opaque.

Positive test 
A positive test shows a bluish-white streak of precipitated proteins. The degree of turbidity depends on the amount of protein in the CSF. It can vary from faint turbidity (mild to moderate elevation in CSF proteins) to dense milky precipitate (high protein content in CSF).

The positive Pandy's reaction may indicate one or more of the following pathological conditions:

 Diabetes mellitus
 Brain tumor (Meningioma, Acoustic neuroma or, Ependymoma)
 Encapsulated brain abscess
 Spinal cord tumor
 Multiple sclerosis
 Acute purulent Meningitis
 Granulomatous Meningitis
 Carcinomatous Meningitis
 Syphilis  (protein may be normal if longstanding)
 Guillain–Barré syndrome [Infectious polyneuritis] (Protein rises after 5–7 days)
 Cushing's disease
 Connective tissue disease
 Uremia
 Myxedema
 Cerebral hemorrhage

Negative test 
No cloudy turbidity observed. The CSF sample is normal i.e. with normal protein contents.

Please note that the normal CSF protein is also obtained in several pathological conditions like viral CNS infections, brainstem glioma, ischemic cerebrovascular accident.

References 

 Merriam-Webster's Free Medical Dictionary. http://www.merriam-webster.com/medical/pandy%27s+test?show=0&t=1288164619
 Biology-Online Dictionary. http://www.biology-online.org/dictionary/Pandys_reaction
 Kooiker and Roberts (1998) Procedures in ER
 Ravel (1995) Lab Medicine, Mosby
 Tunkel and Mandell (2000) Infectious Disease

External links 
Diagnostic test

CSF tests